The Tanzanian illadopsis (Illadopsis distans) is a species of bird in the family Pellorneidae. It is found in Kenya and Tanzania. It was formerly considered a subspecies of the pale-breasted illadopsis (Illadopsis rufipennis). Its natural habitats are subtropical or tropical moist lowland forest and subtropical or tropical moist montane forest.

References

Tanzanian illadopsis
Birds of the African tropical rainforest
Tanzanian illadopsis
Tanzanian illadopsis